Ait Baha (in tifinagh : ⴰⵢⵜ ⴱⴰⵀⵔⴰ) is a town in Chtouka Aït Baha Province, Souss-Massa, Morocco. According to the 2004 census it has a population of 4,767.

References

Populated places in Chtouka Aït Baha Province
Municipalities of Morocco